Vertical Love is a 1997 Cuban comedy film directed by Arturo Sotto Díaz. The film was selected as the Cuban entry for the Best Foreign Language Film at the 70th Academy Awards, but was not accepted as a nominee.

Cast
 Jorge Perugorría as Ernesto Navarro Aces
 Sílvia Águila as Estela Diaz Iglesias
 Susana Pérez as Lucia
 Manuel Porto as Faustino
 Aramís Delgado as Tio Carlos
 Vicente Revuelta as Abuelo

See also
 List of submissions to the 70th Academy Awards for Best Foreign Language Film
 List of Cuban submissions for the Academy Award for Best Foreign Language Film

References

External links
 

1997 films
1997 comedy films
1990s Spanish-language films
Cuban comedy films